Pedro Luziense de Bittencourt Calasans (January 29, 1837 – February 24, 1874) was a Brazilian poet, playwright and journalist, adept of the "Ultra-Romanticism" movement.

Life 
Calasans was born in the city of Santa Luzia do Itanhy, in the Brazilian State of Sergipe, to Lieutenant Colonel João José de Bittencourt Calasans (who would be the governor of Sergipe later) and Luísa Carolina Amélia de Calasans. He initiated his studies at the Liceu São Cristóvão, finishing them in Recife, Pernambuco. At 16 years of age, he published his first poetry book, Adeus!.

In 1855, he entered the Faculdade de Direito do Recife, published another poetry book (Páginas Soltas) and started to collaborate with some newspapers. Graduating in 1859, he returned to Sergipe, to the city of Estância, where he married a wealthy lady; however, they divorced some years later.

Moving to Rio de Janeiro in 1861, he became a deputy from 1861 to 1864, dedicating himself solely to journalism and advocacy. In 1864, he traveled to Europe, where he wrote three more books: Ofenísia (while in Brussels), Uma Cena de Nossos Dias, and Wiesbade (both while in Leipzig).

Returning to Brazil in 1867, he became a judge in the city of Caçapava, publishing four more books: A Campa e a Rosa (in which he translated many poems by Victor Hugo), A Morte de Uma Virgem, Qual Delas? and A Rosa e o Sol. He became a provincial deputy in Rio Grande do Sul, later transferring himself to Jeremoabo (Bahia) due to health problems.

His health problems eventually evolved into tuberculosis, and, in unsuccessful attempts to mitigate the disease, Calasans traveled to Ilhéus (Bahia), Serro and Diamantina (both in Minas Gerais). In a final attempt, Calasans embarked to Madeira, but died on ship before arriving at his destination.

Works

Poetry 
 Adeus! (1853)
 Páginas Soltas (1855)
 Últimas Páginas (1858)
 Ofenísia (1864)
 Wiesbade (1864)
 A Morte de Uma Virgem (1867)
 A Rosa e o Sol (1867)
 Qual Delas? (1867)
 A Campa e a Rosa (1867)
 Brazilina (1870)
 Camerino: Episódio da Guerra do Paraguai (1875 — posthumous)
 As Flores de Laranjeira (1881 — posthumous)
 Waterloo (1900 — posthumous)
 A Cascata de Paulafonso (1906 — posthumous)

Critics 
 Traços Ligeiros Sobre o Casamento Civil (1859)
 A Demagogia Entre Nós (1861)

Theatre 
 Uma Cena de Nossos Dias (1864)

External links 
 A poem by Pedro de Calasans 
 A profile of Calasans and other writers from Sergipe 
 Works by Calasans at the official site of the Universidade Federal de Santa Catarina 

1837 births
1874 deaths
Brazilian male poets
Brazilian journalists
Romantic poets
Portuguese-language writers
People from Sergipe
19th-century deaths from tuberculosis
19th-century journalists
Male journalists
19th-century Brazilian poets
19th-century Brazilian dramatists and playwrights
Brazilian male dramatists and playwrights
19th-century Brazilian male writers
Tuberculosis deaths in Portugal